Statistics of Belgian First Division in the 1941–42 season.

Overview

It was contested by 14 teams, and Lierse S.K. won the championship.
No clubs were relegated owing to the expansion of the Premier Division the following season from 14 clubs to 16.

League standings

Results

References

Belgian Pro League seasons
1941–42 in Belgian football
Belgian